Gonbad-e Kavus County is in Golestan province, Iran. The capital of the county is the city of Gonbad-e Kavus, founded by German engineers and architects with high urban engineering standards; by the order of Reza Pahlavi. At the 2006 census, the county's population was 283,331 in 63,482 households. The following census in 2011 counted 325,789 people in 83,369 households. At the 2016 census, the county's population was 348,744 in 97,147 households.

Formerly called Gorgan or Jorjan, because of the ruins of the historical city called Gorgan, the capital of the Ziyarid dynasty, in its southwest corner. It was called Hyrcania in ancient times.

Administrative divisions

The population history of Gonbad-e Kavus County's administrative divisions over three consecutive censuses is shown in the following table. The latest census shows two districts, six rural districts, and two cities.

References

 

Counties of Golestan Province